George A. Seitz was an officer in the United States Navy. He was born March 13, 1897, in Rochester, New York, the son of Albert and Caroline (Dubelbeiss) Seitz. Seitz graduated from the Naval Academy in Annapolis in 1916. He attended graduate school at MIT and organized the transport of material to North Africa during the Allied invasion and occupation. After the war, Seitz became commander of the Marshall Islands, with the rank of commodore. According to US Navy records, he was flown from his headquarters at Kwajalein, on October 15, 1947, for treatment of a severe case of bronchial pneumonia. He died of a "heart ailment" ten days later. He was fifty years old. America detonated two atomic bombs in the Marshall Islands before Commodore Seitz died.

Honors
A school in the Marshall Islands is named for Seitz.

George Seitz Elementary School, Kwajalein, Marshall Islands, Pacific Ocean
https://web.archive.org/web/20091107151117/http://www.smdc.army.mil/KWAJ/Logistics/Personnel/education.html

References
Seitz' New York Times obituary
Interviews with crewmen aboard the Bunker Hill
Official reports of the nuclear tests at the Marshall Islands
Commodore Seitz official Navy record
Danger's Hour
Photograph of a Kwajelin dinner party hosted by Seitz

1897 births
1947 deaths
Military personnel from Rochester, New York
United States Navy officers
United States Naval Academy alumni
United States Navy personnel of World War I
United States Navy personnel of World War II